See
Pimenteira language
Vereda Pimenteira river
Pimenteiras